George Eames Barstow (November 19, 1849 – April 30, 1924), described as a "capitalist and irrigation pioneer," was a Texas land developer and a member of both the Providence, Rhode Island, common council (four years) and the city's school board (fourteen years), as well as the State Assembly from 1894 to 1896. He was known as "the father of irrigation in the Southwest."

Business career

Barstow began his business career at the age of seventeen and eventually "founded, financed or organized" five worsted and paper mills in Rhode Island.

He then turned his attention to the Pecos Valley in Texas, where the Pioneer Canal Company was chartered on September 30, 1889, with Barstow as treasurer. He later served as president of a successor company, the Pecos Valley Land and Irrigation Company.

In 1891 Barstow and other land developers formed a project to promote a town on the Texas and Pacific Railway in western Ward County, Texas.  By 1895 the town had taken on  the name of Barstow, and Barstow himself moved there from New York City in 1904. He took part  in organizing other irrigation and drainage systems through the West.

Volunteer work

Barstow, a Republican, wrote pamphlets on varied subjects, including immigration, cooperatives, China-Japan relations and Americanism.

Irrigation and immigration

In 1908–09 Barstow was the president of the National Irrigation Congress, the leading organization interested in water projects in the West, and he was in charge of the annual convention in 1909 in Spokane, Washington. A Los Angeles Times reporter wrote about the impending congress that Barstow "has been a prime mover in inducing the federal government to build the systems that will make fertile over 3,000,000 acres of land which once was a desert." In an interview, Barstow predicted that isolated farmhouses would become "a thing of the past" and that farmers would commute from their homes to farms via fast horses or automobiles or interurban streetcars.   He added:

The government is laying out towns every five miles. . . . The farms will be small, ten to forty acres, and the farming intensive. Under these circumstances, the farmers will live in  towns of 1500 to 2000 people, enjoying all the benefits of urban life — schools, churches and social life. . . . A tide from the city to the country has already set in. Many college graduates have chosen farming on irrigated tracts for their life work.

In his opening speech at the Spokane congress, Barstow urged the government to find work for (overseas) immigrants "out West," to provide them with transportation and to lend them money to establish homes.  He asked:

Shall I, who have always been broadly conservative, be regarded as preaching paternalism or as socialistic in my purpose when suggesting that the duty of the National  Government may be found in providing under proper safeguard a fund which may be used to make loans of suitable amount to enable this thrifty and frugal class of people to locate their homes . . . ?

Barstow was head of the National Immigration Commission in 1912, and he sent a message to the first convention of the American Immigration and Distribution League in New York City in April of that year "stating that 65 per cent. of the immigrants who came to the country were farm laborers, and that the United States Government ought to establish an Immigrant Land Loan Fund, which would advance small sums to immigrants who settled on Western lands."

Offices and memberships

 President, National Drainage Congress, 1907–08
 President, eleventh International Irrigation Congress, 1908–09
 Vice president, Texas Conservation Commission
 President, West Texas Reclamation Association
 Member, Conference of Governors, 1908
 Delegate, World Court Congress, Cleveland, 1915
 Life director, Euphrates College, Turkey
 Fellow, Royal Society of Arts, London
 Councilor, World's Purity Congress
 Member and fellow, Society of Applied Psychology, San Francisco
 Member, committee on conferences, American Agricultural Association
 Member, advisory committee of the University Forum, New York
 Member, American Society of International Law
 Member, National Institute of Social Sciences
 Member, Southern Sociological Congress
 Member, National Child Labor Committee
 Member, National Civic Federation
 Member, American Institute of Civics
 Member, Academy of Political Science
 Member, American Society of Judicial Settlement of International Disputes
 Member, International Peace Forum
 Member, League to Enforce Peace
 Member, International World Conscience Society, Rome
 Member, Navy League
 Member, Rhode Island Historical Society
 Member, Empire State Society of the Sons of the American Revolution
 Member, Pennsylvania Academy of Fine Arts
 Member, New York Museum of Natural History

Personal life

Barstow was born on November 19, 1849, in Providence, the son of Amos Chafee, a manufacturer, banker and one of the most prominent men in the city, and Emeline (Mumford) Eames. Young George was educated at a public school and at Mowry and Goff's Classical School in that city. He was married to Clara Drew Symonds on October 19, 1871. They had nine children — Caroline Hartwell, George Eames Jr., Herbert Symonds, Helen Louise, Harold Carleton, Marguerite, Putnam, Donald and  a ninth child,  John P. or Paris (the sources differ). Barstow, who attended a Congregational church in Providence and a Methodist church in Texas, died on April 30, 1924, in Barstow and was buried in the Barstow Cemetery.

References

1849 births
1924 deaths
American businesspeople
Republican Party members of the Rhode Island House of Representatives